The 2015–16 Biathlon World Cup – World Cup 1 was the opening event of the season and was held in Östersund, Sweden, from 29 November until 6 December 2015.

Schedule of events

Medal winners

Men

Women

Mixed

Achievements 

 Best performance for all time

 , 17th place in Individual
 , 18th place in Individual
 , 25th place in Individual
 , 33rd place in Individual
 , 55th place in Individual
 , 56th place in Individual
 , 64th place in Individual
 , 80th place in Individual
 , 83rd place in Individual
 , 1st place in Individual
 , 2nd place in Sprint
 , 8th place in Individual
 , 15th place in Individual
 , 29th place in Individual
 , 31st place in Individual
 , 40th place in Individual
 , 61st place in Individual

 First World Cup race

 , 47th place in Individual
 , 87th place in Individual
 , 96th place in Individual
 , 69th place in Individual
 , 79th place in Individual

 Oldest winner of a biathlon world cup race in history

 , 41 years and 309 days

References 

Biathlon World Cup - World Cup 1, 2015-16
2015–16 Biathlon World Cup
November 2015 sports events in Europe
December 2015 sports events in Europe
Sports competitions in Östersund
Biathlon competitions in Sweden